The Portuguese Burghers are an ethnic group in Sri Lanka, of mixed Portuguese and Sri Lankan descent. They are largely Roman Catholic and some still speak the Sri Lanka Indo-Portuguese language, a creole based on Portuguese mixed with Sinhalese.  In modern times, English has become the common language while Sinhalese is taught in school as a second language. Portuguese Burghers sometimes mixed with but are to be distinguished from other Burgher people, such as Dutch Burghers.

Origins 
The Portuguese Burghers are largely descendants of the Sri Lanka Mestiços, the people of mixed Portuguese and Sri Lankan descent (commonly of a Portuguese father and a Sri Lankan mother) who appeared in the 16th century, after the Portuguese explorers found the sea route to the Indian Ocean.  When the Dutch took over coastal Sri Lanka (formerly Ceylon), the descendants of the Portuguese took refuge in the central hills of Kandyan Kingdom under Sinhalese rule.  In time, the Dutch and Portuguese descendants intermarried. Under Dutch rule Portuguese was banned, but the Portuguese-speaking community was so widespread that even the Dutch started to speak Portuguese.  

In the 18th century, the Eurasian community (a mixture of Portuguese, Dutch, and Sinhalese as well as Tamil, known as the Burgher) grew, speaking Portuguese or Dutch.  The Portuguese Burghers followed Catholicism and spoke a Portuguese creole, Sri Lanka Indo-Portuguese language. Despite their socio-economic disadvantage, these Burghers maintained their Portuguese cultural identity. In Batticaloa, the Catholic Burgher Union reinforced this. The Portuguese Creole also continued to be used amongst the Dutch Burghers families as the informal language until the end of the 19th century.

In today's Sri Lanka, the Creole is limited to the spoken form. Most of the speakers are the Burghers in the Eastern province (Batticaloa and Trincomalee). But there are also the Kaffirs (people of African origin) in the Northwestern province (Puttalam). The Portuguese, Dutch and British brought the Kaffirs to Sri Lanka, for labour purposes. They have assumed Portuguese culture and religion.

Genetics 
Phenotypically, Burghers can be either light-skinned or dark-skinned, depending on their ancestral history. It is common to find Burghers with dark- to light-brown skin (usually Portuguese Burghers or Kaffirs) with European facial features common to the Mediterranean basin (see Mediterraneans). In some Portuguese Burgher families, it is common to have both very dark children and children with fair skin. Most light-skinned Burghers are of Dutch or British descent.

Current status 
At the 1981 Census, the Burghers (Dutch and Portuguese) were almost 40,000 (0.3% of the population of Sri Lanka).  Many Burghers have emigrated to other countries. There are still 100 families in Batticaloa and Trincomalee and 80 Kaffir families in Puttalam that speak Sri Lanka Indo-Portuguese language; they have been out of contact with Portugal since 1656. The Burgher population worldwide is approximated to be around 100,000, concentrated mostly in the United Kingdom, Canada, Australia and New Zealand.

References 

Portuguese people in Sri Lanka
European diaspora in Sri Lanka
Burgher people
Multiracial affairs in Asia
Portuguese colonisation in Asia
Portuguese diaspora in Asia